The S. Curtis Smith House is a historic house at 56 Fairmont Avenue in Newton, Massachusetts.  The -story wood-frame house was built c. 1883, and is one of Newton's finest Queen Anne Victorian houses.  It exhibits a full range of that style's features, including asymmetrical massing with numerous and varied gables, a tower with an octagonal arched roof, bands of different types of shingling, and an ornately decorated front portico.  The house was built for S. Curtis Smith, a schoolteacher.

The house was listed on the National Register of Historic Places in 1986 as the "Curtis S. Smith House".

See also
 National Register of Historic Places listings in Newton, Massachusetts

References

Houses on the National Register of Historic Places in Newton, Massachusetts
Queen Anne architecture in Massachusetts
Houses completed in 1883